Sulitjelma Church is a parish church of the Church of Norway in Fauske Municipality in Nordland county, Norway. It is located in the village of Sulitjelma. It is the church for the Sulitjelma parish which is part of the Salten prosti (deanery) in the Diocese of Sør-Hålogaland. The white, wooden church was built in a long church style in 1899 using plans drawn up by the architect Worm Hirsch Lund. The church seats about 300 people.

History
The parish received permission via a royal resolution on 27 May 1899 to construct a church in Sulitjelma. Construction began soon afterwards. The building was consecrated on 12 November 1899 by Bishop Peter Wilhelm Bøckman (1851–1926). In 1996, a new parish graveyard was built on the southern part of the village, and the Sulitjelma Chapel was built on that site.

Media gallery

See also
List of churches in Sør-Hålogaland

References

Fauske
Churches in Nordland
Wooden churches in Norway
19th-century Church of Norway church buildings
Churches completed in 1899
1899 establishments in Norway
Long churches in Norway